Valberg is a ski resort in the French alps in the Alpes-Maritimes department. It is located on the towns of Guillaumes, Péone and Beuil.

Opened in 1936.

Piste and Lift Facilities

References

External links

Ski stations in France
Tourist attractions in Alpes-Maritimes
Sports venues in Alpes-Maritimes
Skiing in the Maritime Alps